Adam Matthew Porter (born 8 April 2002) is an English professional footballer who plays as a midfielder for Truro City on loan from  club Salford City.

Career
Porter was born in Biddulph and joined the Stoke City Academy from a young age. He progressed through the youth teams and was made captain of the under-18 side by Kevin Russell. In October 2019, he joined Northern Premier League side Leek Town on loan, where he made three appearances in all competitions. He began to travel with the first team towards the end of the 2019–20 season and was named on the bench against Nottingham Forest. Porter made his professional debut on 10 August 2021 in a EFL Cup match against Fleetwood Town. On 5 November 2021 Porter joined National League side Altrincham on a four-week youth loan. Porter made ten appearances for the Robins before returning to Stoke. Porter was released by Stoke at the end of the 2021–22 season, having spent 14 years at the club.

Following his release from Stoke City, Porter signed for EFL League Two club Salford City. On 21 October 2022, Porter joined Southern Football League Premier Division South club Truro City on loan.

Career statistics

References

Living people
2002 births
English footballers
Association football midfielders
Stoke City F.C. players
Leek Town F.C. players
Altrincham F.C. players
Salford City F.C. players
Truro City F.C. players
Northern Premier League players
National League (English football) players